Ilıcalar is a town (belde) in Bingöl District, Bingöl Province, Turkey. The village is populated by Kurds and had a population of 3,141 in 2021.

References

Towns in Turkey
Populated places in Bingöl District

Kurdish settlements in Bingöl Province